Romania–Ukraine relations are foreign relations between Romania and Ukraine. Diplomatic relations between both countries were established on February 9, 1918, and re-established in 1992. In 2020, it was announced that Romania would open a consulate for Ukraine in Sighetu Marmației.

Disputes
Romania and Ukraine had been negotiating a broad treaty of friendship and cooperation for several years, but disagreement over ownership of the Snake Island and more importantly the oil and gas reserves that are thought to lie beneath its area of the Black Sea, as well as the northern border of Romania with Ukraine, had kept the sides apart. In June 1997, Romania signed a bilateral treaty with Ukraine that, among other concerned, resolved territorial and minority issues that had impeded the development of improved relations between the two countries:

 The dispute between Romania and Ukraine over borders near the Snake Island (approx 50 km east of Sulina) and its continental shelf of the Black Sea under which significant gas and oil deposits may exist, has been resolved after the 2009 ruling of the International Court of Justice.
 The dispute between Romania and Ukraine over the construction of the Bystroye Canal.

History
On 5 September 2020, the Minister of National Defense of Romania Nicolae Ciucă and the Minister of Defense of Ukraine Andriy Taran signed an agreement for technical and military cooperation between the two countries.

On 4 April 2022, amid the 2022 Russian invasion of Ukraine, Zelenskyy gave a speech to the Parliament of Romania. Later, on 26 April, a group of Romanian officials visited Kyiv, promising more cooperation between Romania and Ukraine. After this, Russian hacking group started a campaign of cyberattacks against Romanian government and other official websites.

On 19 April 2022 Romania announced a planned reform to the government decree that regulates the export of military weapons and national defence products in order to provide these weapons not only to NATO allies but also to Ukraine. The Ministry of Defense developed the draft decree which states that the reason behind this decision is Russia's aggression against Ukraine.

Maritime delimitation

The status of Snake Island was important for delimitation of continental shelf and exclusive economic zones between the two countries. If Snake Island were recognized as an island, then continental shelf around it should be considered as Ukrainian water. If Snake Island were not an island, but a rock, then in accordance with international law the maritime boundary between Romania and Ukraine should be drawn without taking into consideration the isle location.

On 4 July 2003 the President of Romania Ion Iliescu and the President of Russia Vladimir Putin signed a treaty about friendship and cooperation. Romania promised not to contest territories of Ukraine or Moldova, which it lost  to Soviet Union after World War II, but requested that Russia as a successor of the Soviet Union recognized  in some form its responsibility for what had happened.

On 16 September 2004 the Romanian side brought a case against Ukraine to the International Court of Justice (ICJ) in a dispute concerning the maritime boundary between the two States in the Black Sea.

On 2007, Ukraine founded the small settlement of Bile on the island, which was criticized by Romania.

On February 3, 2009, the ICJ delivered its judgment, which divided the sea area of the Black Sea along a line which was between the claims of each country. The Court invoked the disproportionality test in adjudicating the dispute, noting that the ICJ, "as its jurisprudence has indicated, it may on occasion decide not to take account of very small islands or decide not to give them their full potential entitlement to maritime zones, should such an approach have a disproportionate effect on the delimitation line under consideration" and owing to a previous agreement between Ukraine and Romania, the island "should have no effect on the delimitation in this case, other than that stemming from the role of the 12-nautical-mile arc of its territorial sea" previously agreed between the parties.

Resident diplomatic missions
 Romania has an embassy in Kyiv and consulates-general in Chernivtsi and Odesa and a consulate in Solotvyno.
 Ukraine has an embassy in Bucharest.

See also 
 Romania–Ukraine border
 Foreign relations of Romania
 Foreign relations of Ukraine
 Romanians in Ukraine
 Ukrainians of Romania
 Ukraine–European Union relations

References

External links 
   Romanian embassy in Kyiv
  Ukrainian embassy in Bucharest
 Bukovina Region in the Collective Memory of Ukraine and Romania. By Valentyna Vasylova

 
Ukraine
Bilateral relations of Ukraine